Russian Translation is a 2007 Russian TV miniseries, based on the novel  The Journalist by  Andrey Konstantinov (1996).

The plot is set in the 1980s and follows Soviet military advisors and translators working in Arab countries, specifically in Yemen and Libya.

Plot summary
The film story begins in the second half of 1984   the final months of Konstantin Chernenko era - ending in the first part of 1991 - a few months before the anti-Gorbachev's GKChP coup d'état attempt.

A hero   Andrey Obnorsky (Nikita Zverev), a young student-orientalist from Leningrad - along the line of the Soviet Defense Ministry falls on his Arabic language practice into Marxist South Yemen.

When he comes by Aeroflot Tu-154M plane in PDRY's capital Aden he feels shocked! He has to understand a local dialectal speech - but they learned only the language of the Quran! He has to survive in this Arabian heat   but they say Soviet predecessors - Englishmen - freed their servicemen, who served in Aden, from the penal responsibility for several years because of it.

Above this,   Obnorsky  has had to be a translator and interpreter in a newly forming elite 7th Airborne brigade of the General Staff of the People's Democratic Republic of Yemen, to  take part in the near-boundary  clashes of southerners with the northerners (the way to the unification of Yemen was entirely complex) as well as between government forces and  murtazaks, southern local armed opposition men, coming from abroad.

Without his own will, Obnorsky  occurs in the middle of a dangerous plot with the participation of the KGB, GRU men, and Palestinians, who had to receive a large party of weapons from the USSR, and the quarreling fractions in the ruling Yemeni Socialist Party authorities, President Ali Nasser Muhammad supporters and opposition, before and during bloody combat on the streets of Aden.

Yet in the Happy Arabia the hero of film will meet his love, and then will find two most loyal friends. Another Arabic language student-interpreter Ilya Novoselov (Andrey Frolov), a  cadet from the legendary Moscow VIIJa (the Military Institute - formerly the Military Institute of Foreign Languages of the Red Army), will introduce him into the vicious circle of military interpreters. The Palestinian instructor officer called  Sindibad (Ramil Sabitov), the master of a hand-to-hand fighting, will teach him to fight.

After being graduated from the Leningrad State University and urgent service of two years in one of the Soviet flying military schools - already as the interpreter/translator-officer   Obnorsky  goes again to the Arab World, now to Libya. This mission from The Ten  (the 10th Main Direction of the General Staff of the Ministry of Defence of the USSR) also will not be calm. There will be some Moscow's  gilded youth  in his, senior translator, subordination, who must be run and translate! There will some modern Soviet-made fighters disappear from the Benina Libyan airbase, and Obnorskij will be asked to clear up the situation for the Soviet competent bodies.

Finally, his friend Ilya Novoselov commits suicide leaving a very strange letter, and Obnorsky begins his own dangerous investigation which leads him to his old enemy from Adeni times  his elder colleague and GRU man Kukarintsev (Pavel Novikov).

Historical accuracy 

Despite of his own life experience as a military interpreter/translator with the Soviet military advisors in South Yemen and Libya the author of the novel, Andrey Konstantinov, stresses in the very beginning of his bestseller: any coincidences with real historical persons, places and events are sudden but all the differences from a real historical accuracy are "conforming to the laws of nature". It was really a big and hard task to camouflage a routine lowest ranking serviceman-interpreter every day work and life with a war and detective plot full of danger and adventure making a readable novel for a wide Russian public of the mid-nineties. To hyperbolise and puzzle true facts and change some geography and peoples' names and to generate new unknown "historical facts" to make a novel looking alive. However, despite the author's words he has told in his preface to the story, which were mentioned above, the young generation of Russian readers continue to read this novel.

The book format helps a lot in this switching on every reader's individual fantasy. However the film or series format demanded a return to some kind of remaking of true historical realities and to restore some general distinctive features of that time local environmental and cultural, political, ideological, military, social,  native, conversational and many other  exotic details, which are easy to be remembered and recognised by  those who took part in that or similar events.

Music
The music for the film was composed by Igor Kornelyuk. The song  Pismo  (The Letter) is the first  rap experience of this known composer from Saint Petersburg. Words:  Regina Lisits. Performance:   Pavel Ostroumov and Nina Vedenina.

Cast

Russia
 Nikita Zverev  as Andrey Obnorsky
 Andrey Frolov as Ilya Novoselov
 Ramil Sabitov as Sindibad, Palestinian officer
 Sergey Selin as major Doroshenko
 Sergey Veksler as colonel Gromov
 Pavel Novikov as Kukarintsev, then Djomin
 Aleksandr Tyutin as KGB-man Tsarkov
 Aleksandr Pashutin as general Sorokin
 Aleksandr Tsurkan as head of translators in Aden Pakhomenko
 Aleksandr Jakovlev as colonel Gritsaljuk
 Alyona Yakovleva as a wife of an artillery advisor
 Tatiana Abramova as secretary Marina
 Viktor Alfyorov as translator Nazrullo Tashkorov
 Mikhail Politseymako as translator Fikret Gusejnov
 Vladimir Epifantsev as translator Vikhrenko
 Aleksandr Makagon as translator Vyrodin
 Sergey Shekhovtsev as colonel Karpukhin
 Anton Eldarov as  translator Tsyganov
 Ivan Mokhovikov as translator Gridich
 Konstantin Karasik as driver Gena
 Valery Zhakov as Victor Obnorsky, Andrey's father
 Kirill Pletnyov as investigator Kondrashov
 Maria Antipp as Irina
 Anton Kukushkin as translator Kolokol'chikov
 Denis Yasik as translator Bubentsov
 Roman Nesterenko as military school lecturer
 Aleksandr Ablyazov as colonel Sectris
 Vladimir Goryushin as Strumsky
 Aleksey Oshurkov as our man in Benghazi
 Pavel Smetankin as episode

Azerbaijan

Polad Fuad Agaragim Ogly  as General Abdu Salih
Fuad Osmanov as major Mansour
Firdavsi Atakishijev as colonel Isa

References

External links
 Russian Translation TV serial presentation, description and forum - in Russian and English
A.Cherniaev's interview in IZVESTIA newspaper on March 5, 2007 - in Russian
The First Channel World Service - Russian Translation release - In Russian
   Yemen Observer - Aden Civil War Recreated in Russian TV Drama
      Andrey Obnorsky on Buzzle.com: Looking For a  Good Boy  Hero For Russian TV Serials.
   Changing Notions of Realism in Russian Primetime TV Drama and Film, by David MacFadyen (UCLA)
  Film about film.
  Andrey Konstantinov's biography

2007 Russian television series debuts
2007 Russian television series endings
2000s Russian television series
Russian crime television series
Russian television miniseries
Films about interpreting and translation
Channel One Russia original programming